62TV Records is an independent record label based in Brussels, Belgium. The label specializes in artists of various subgenres of indie pop and is distributed by Bang! Music.

Artists
 Austin Lace
 Flexa Lyndo
 Fonda 500
 Girls in Hawaii
 Hallo Kosmo
 Lucy Lucy!
 Minerale
 Sharko
 The Tellers

See also
 List of record labels

References

External links

Belgian record labels